Asmodeus (Asmodaios) or Ashmedai (ʾAšmədʾāy; see below for other variations), is a prince of demons and hell. In Judeo-Islamic lore he is the king of both daemons (jinn/shedim) and demons (divs). Asmodeus is mostly known from the deuterocanonical Book of Tobit, in which he is the primary antagonist, or the Ars Goetia. In Peter Binsfeld's classification of demons, Asmodeus represents lust. The demon is also mentioned in some Talmudic legends; for instance, in the story of the construction of the Temple of Solomon. In Islam, he is identified with the "puppet" mentioned in the Quran, which dethroned Solomon and reigned over his kingdom until he got his kingship back.

Etymology 

The name Asmodai is believed to derive from the Avestan *aēšma-daēva (𐬀𐬉𐬴𐬨𐬀𐬛𐬀𐬉𐬎𐬎𐬀*, *aēṣ̌madaēuua), where aēšma means "wrath", and daēva signifies "demon".  While the daēva Aēšma is thus Zoroastrianism's demon of wrath and is also well-attested as such, the compound aēšma-daēva is not attested in scripture. It is nonetheless likely that such a form did exist, and that the Book of Tobit's "Asmodaios" and the Talmud's "Ashmedai" reflect it. In the Zoroastrian and Middle Persian demonology, there did exist the conjuncted form khashm-dev (خشم + دیو), where both terms are cognates.

The spellings Asmoday, Asmodai, Asmodee (also Asmodée), Osmodeus, and Osmodai have also been used. The name is alternatively spelled in the bastardized forms (based on the basic consonants אשמדאי, ʾŠMDʾY) Hashmedai (חַשְמְדּאָי, Ḥašmədʾāy; also Hashmodai, Hasmodai, Khashmodai, Khasmodai), Hammadai (חַמַּדּאָי, Hammadʾāy; also Khammadai), Shamdon (שַׁמְדּוֹן, Šamdōn), and Shidonai (שִׁדֹנאָי, Šīdōnʾāy). Some traditions have subsequently identified Shamdon as the father of Asmodeus.

The Jewish Encyclopedia of 1906 rejects the otherwise accepted etymological relation between the Persian "Æshma-dæva" and Judaism's "Ashmodai" claiming that the particle "-dæva" could not have become "-dai" and that Æshma-dæva as such—a compound name—never appears in Persian sacred texts. Still, the encyclopedia proposes that the "Asmodeus" from the Apocrypha and the Testament of Solomon are not only related somewhat to Aeshma but have similar behaviour, appearance and roles, to conclude in another article under the entry "Aeshma", in the paragraph "Influence of Persian Beliefs on Judaism", that Persian Zoroastrian beliefs could have heavily influenced Judaism's theology on the long term, bearing in mind that in some texts there are crucial conceptual differences while in others there seems to be a great deal of similarity, proposing a pattern of influence over folk beliefs that would extend further to the mythology itself. However, the Jewish Encyclopedia asserts that although 'Æshma does not occur in the Avesta in conjunction with dæva, it is probable that a fuller form, such as Æshmo-dæus, has existed, since it is paralleled by the later Pahlavi-form "Khashm-dev"'. Furthermore, it is stated that Asmodeus or Ashmedai "embodies an expression of the influence that the Persian religion or Persian popular beliefs have exercised" on Judaism.

In the texts

In the Hebrew Bible
The full name "Ashmedai" is not found in the standard Masoretic canon of the Hebrew Bible.

In the Book of Tobit
The Asmodeus of the Book of Tobit is hostile to Sarah, Raguel's daughter,; and slays seven successive husbands on their wedding nights, impeding the sexual consummation of the marriages. In the New Jerusalem Bible translation, he is described as "the worst of demons" (Tobit 3:8). When the young Tobias is about to marry her, Asmodeus proposes the same fate for him, but Tobias is enabled, through the counsels of his attendant angel Raphael, to render him innocuous. By placing a fish's heart and liver on red-hot cinders, Tobias produces a smoky vapour that causes the demon to flee to Egypt, where Raphael binds him. According to some translations, Asmodeus is strangled.

Perhaps Asmodeus punishes the suitors for their carnal desire, since Tobias prays to be free from such desire and is kept safe. Asmodeus is also described as an evil spirit in general: 'Ασμοδαίος τὸ πονηρὸν δαιμόνιον or τὸ δαιμόνιον πονηρόν, and πνεῦμα ἀκάθαρτον.

In the Talmud
The figure of Ashmedai in the Talmud is less malign in character than the Asmodeus of Tobit. In the former, he appears repeatedly in the light of a good-natured and humorous fellow. But besides that, there is one feature in which he parallels Asmodeus, in as much as his desires turn upon Bathsheba and later Solomon's wives.

Another Talmudic legend has King Solomon tricking Asmodai into collaborating in the construction of the Temple of Jerusalem (see: The Story of King Solomon and Ashmedai).

Another legend depicts Asmodai throwing King Solomon over 400 leagues away from the capital by putting one wing on the ground and the other stretched skyward. He then changed places for some years with King Solomon. When King Solomon returned, Asmodai fled from his wrath. Similar legends can be found in Islamic lore. Asmodeus is referred to as Sakhr ( the Rock or the Stony One), because Solomon banished him into a rock, after he takes his kingdom back from him. He is considered to be a king of the jinn or demons (divs).

Another passage describes him as marrying Lilith, who became his queen.

In the Testament of Solomon
In the Testament of Solomon, a 1st–3rd century text, the king invokes Asmodeus to aid in the construction of the Temple. The demon appears and predicts Solomon's kingdom will one day be divided (Testament of Solomon, verse 21–25). When Solomon interrogates Asmodeus further, the king learns that Asmodeus is thwarted by the angel Raphael, as well as by sheatfish found in the rivers of Assyria. He also admits to hating water and birds because both remind him of God. Asmodeus claims that he was born of a human mother and an angel father.

In the Malleus Maleficarum
In the Malleus Maleficarum (1486), Asmodeus was considered the demon of lust. Sebastien Michaelis said that his adversary is St. John. Some demonologists of the 16th century assigned a month to a demon and considered November to be the month in which Asmodai's power was strongest. Other demonologists asserted that his zodiacal sign was Aquarius but only between the dates of January 30 and February 8.

He has 72 legions of demons under his command. He is one of the Kings of Hell under Lucifer the emperor. He incites gambling, and is the overseer of all the gambling houses in the court of Hell. Some Catholic theologians compared him with Abaddon. Yet other authors considered Asmodeus a prince of revenge.

In the Dictionnaire Infernal
The Dictionnaire Infernal (1818) by Collin de Plancy portrays Asmodeus with the breast of a man, a cock leg, serpent tail, three heads (one of a man spitting fire, one of a sheep, and one of a bull), riding a lion with dragon wings and neck - all of these creatures being associated with either lascivity, lust or revenge. The Archbishop of Paris approved the portrait.

In the Lesser Key of Solomon
Asmodai appears as the king 'Asmoday' in the Ars Goetia, where he is said to have a seal in gold and is listed as number thirty-two according to respective rank.

He "is strong, powerful and appears with three heads; the first is like a bull, the second like a man, and the third like a ram; the tail of a serpent, and from his mouth issue flames of fire." Also, he sits upon an infernal dragon, holds a lance with a banner and, amongst the Legions of Amaymon, Asmoday governs seventy-two legions of inferior spirits.

In The Magus
Asmodeus is referred to in Book Two, Chapter Eight of The Magus (1801) by Francis Barrett.

Later depictions

In Christian thought 
Asmodeus was named in the Order of Thrones by Gregory the Great.

Asmodeus was cited by the nuns of Loudun in the Loudun possessions of 1634.

Asmodeus' reputation as the personification of lust continued into later writings, as he was known as the "Prince of Lechery" in the 16th-century romance Friar Rush. The French Benedictine Augustin Calmet equated his name with a fine dress. 
The 1409 Lollard manuscript titled Lanterne of Light associated Asmodeus with the deadly sin of lust. The 16th-century Dutch demonologist Johann Weyer described him as the banker at the baccarat table in hell, and overseer of earthly gambling houses.

In 1641, the Spanish playwright and novelist Luis Velez de Guevara published the satirical novel El diablo cojuelo, where Asmodeus is represented as a mischievous demon endowed with a playful and satirical genius. The plot presents a rascal student that hides in an astrologer's mansard. He frees a devil from a bottle. As an acknowledgement the devil shows him the apartments of Madrid and the tricks, miseries and mischiefs of their inhabitants. The French novelist Alain-René Lesage adapted the Spanish source in his 1707 novel le Diable boiteux, where he likened him to Cupid. In the book, he is rescued from an enchanted glass bottle by a Spanish student Don Cleophas Leandro Zambullo. Grateful, he joins with the young man on a series of adventures before being recaptured. Asmodeus is portrayed in a sympathetic light as good-natured, and a canny satirist and critic of human society. In another episode Asmodeus takes Don Cleophas for a night flight, and removes the roofs from the houses of a village to show him the secrets of what passes in private lives. Following Lesage's work, he was depicted in a number of novels and periodicals, mainly in France but also London and New York.

Asmodeus was widely depicted as having a handsome visage, good manners and an engaging nature; however, he was portrayed as walking with a limp and one leg was either clawed or that of a rooster. He walks aided by two walking sticks in Lesage's work, and this gave rise to the English title The Devil on Two Sticks (also later translated The Limping Devil and The Lame Devil). Lesage attributes his lameness to falling from the sky after fighting with another devil.

On 18 February 1865, author Evert A. Duyckinck sent President Abraham Lincoln a letter, apparently mailed from Quincy. Duyckinck signed the letter "Asmodeus", with his initials below his pseudonym. His letter enclosed a newspaper clipping about an inappropriate joke allegedly told by Lincoln at the Hampton Roads Peace Conference. The purpose of Duyckinck's letter was to advise Lincoln of "an important omission" about the history of the conference. He advised that the newspaper clipping be added to the "Archives of the Nation".

In the Kabbalah
According to the Kabbalah and the school of Shlomo ibn Aderet, Asmodeus is born as the result of a union between Agrat bat Mahlat and King David.

In Islam 

In Islamic culture, Asmodeus is known as Sakhr (rock), probably a reference to his fate being imprisoned inside a box of rock, chained with iron and thrown into the sea.

Asmodeus become a central figure in exegesis of the Quranic verse Surah 38:34: "We allowed Solomon to be seduced by temptation, and we cast a body upon his seat. Then he repented."

According Quranic exegesis (tafsir), the "body" is Asmodeus; either a jinni or demon (div) impersonating the king.  Ibn al-Faqih and Aja'ib al-Makhluqat in his Aja'ib al-Makhluqat refer to Sakhr as a jinni, while the Persian Quran exegete (224–310 AH; 839–923 AD) Tabari (224–310 AH; 839–923 AD) refers to him as a shaitan in his work Annals of al-Tabari. Others also identify him as a demon (div), which might have been the Persian term for shaitan as both refer to innovocally evil spirits. After forty days, Solomon defeats Sakhr and gets his throne back, whereupon he imprisons Sakhr in a rock sealed in iron chains and throws him into the sea.

The Stories of the Prophets Qiṣaṣ al-Anbiyāʾ give various reasons for his punishment; sometimes because of acting injustly before a family dispute or hands the ring to a demon in exchange for knowledge, while most sources (such as Tabari, ʿUmāra ibn Wathīma, Thalabi, ibn Asakir, ibn al-Athir) invoke the idea that one of his wives committed idolatry.

This tale became key to medieval Sufism regarding spiritual development. Attar of Nishapur elucidates the allegory: one must behave like a triumphant 'Solomon' and chain the demons of the nafs or lower self, locking the demon-prince into a 'rock', before the rūḥ (soul) can make the first steps to the Divine.

The idea of a spirit in a bottle, released by a fisherman, is probably rooted in this legend concerning Solomon.

In the story of Sakhr and Buluqiya, a young Jewish prince, searching for the final Prophet (Muhammad), Sakhr is said to have reached immortality by drinking from the Well of Immortality, guarded by the mystical being Khidr. He explains the creation of the world by God, explains God's intention to place Muhammad therein and punish the infidels, describing the different layers (ṭabaqāt) of hell and mentions the angels.

In popular culture 
On 23 May 1960, the Tel Aviv newspaper Haboker ran a banner headline announcing the capture of Nazi war criminal Adolf Eichmann by Israeli security forces that read: Ashmadai b'Khevlei Yisrael (אשמדאי בכבלי ישראל), which translates as "Asmodeus in Israeli chains".

Asmodeus is mentioned in the Fraiser episode "Fraiser Lite" (air date January 6, 2004).  He is described as being a "demon of lust, and eater of worlds" by office nerd Noel Shempsky, who expresses frustration that no one else has heard of Asmodeus.

In the video game Helltaker, Asmodeus is depicted as a woman named "Modeus", whom the player can add to their harem.

On October 3, 2021, an episode of the web series Puppet History mentioned Asmodeus's naming in the Loudun Possessions, and a three-headed puppet rendition of Asmodeus both performed the episode's customary ending song and featured in the episode's plot-heavy finale.

On October 31, 2021, an episode of the web cartoon Helluva Boss depicted Asmodeus as a strip club manager.

On August 25, 2022, an episode of the animated series Little Demon depicted Asmodeus as an old associate of Satan trying to get revenge on him.

In the manga Welcome to Demon School! Iruma-kun, Asmodeus is depicted as the best friend of the main character.

See also

 Archdemon
 Belial
 Devil
 Samael
 Satan
 Shedim
 Jinn
 Serpents in the Bible
 Sin

References
Citations

Sources

External links
 

Ifrits
Book of Tobit
Demons in Christianity
Demons in Judaism
Demons in the Old Testament apocrypha
Devils
Goetic demons
Jinn
Mythological kings
Testament of Solomon